Lisiecki (feminine: Lisiecka; plural: Lisieccy) is a Polish surname. Notable people with the surname include:

 Jan Lisiecki (born 1995), Polish-Canadian classical pianist
 Lorraine Lisiecki, American paleoclimatologist
 Paweł Lisiecki (born 1978), Polish politician
 Piotr Lisiecki (born 1993), Polish singer and guitarist

See also
 

Polish-language surnames